Boris Bališ (born 23 November 1993) is a Slovak footballer who plays for Spartak Trnava as a winger.

He is the son of former footballer Igor Bališ, and the brother of Denis Bališ, who also was a footballer.

Club career
He made his debut for Trnava against Slovan Bratislava on 30 October 2014.

References

External links
 
 Eurofotbal profile

1993 births
Living people
Slovak footballers
FC Spartak Trnava players
Slovak Super Liga players
MFK Zemplín Michalovce players
ŠK Senec players
FK Senica players
Sportspeople from Trnava
Association football midfielders